"Seven Years of Letters" is a song by Scottish indie rock band The Twilight Sad. The song was released as the second single from the band's second studio album, Forget the Night Ahead. It was released on 19 October 2009 on Fat Cat Records. The B-side of the single is an acoustic cover of British post-punk band The Wedding Present, originally from their 1991 album Seamonsters.

Guitarist Andy MacFarlane notes that, "We didn't ever intend to have the first three songs in the order that they were released, that's just a coincidence. This one has a guitar solo and a creaky piano seat." About the lyrics, vocalist James Graham said, "The lyrics in the song revolve around running away from things and people."

Track listing

Credits
 James Alexander Graham – vocals
 Andy MacFarlane – guitar
 Craig Orzel – bass
 Mark Devine – drums
 Produced by Andy MacFarlane
 Co-produced by Mark Devine and Paul Savage
 Recorded and mixed by Paul Savage
 Mastered by Alan Douches
 dlt – artwork

References

External links
 Single synopsis at Fat Cat Records

2009 singles
The Twilight Sad songs
2009 songs